Ryan Scott Fisher (born 7 September 1983 in Riverside, California) is a former international motorcycle speedway rider from the United States.

Career
Fisher won the US Junior Championship three times before riding in the United Kingdom for Coventry Bees during the 2002 Elite League speedway season. After spending a second season with Coventry he joined the Oxford Cheetahs in 2004. In between in 2003, he reached the final of the 2003 Speedway Under-21 World Championship.

He did not ride in Britain again until 2007 when he joined the Belle Vue Aces. In 2008, he rode for the Edinburgh Monarchs in the Premier League and the following season doubled up riding for the Edinburgh and Swindon Robins in the Elite League.

In 2011, Fisher moved full-time back into the Elite League, with the Coventry Bees. In 2012, he rode in the Premier League for Plymouth Devils, and has signed to ride for Peterborough Panthers in the Elite League in 2013 and 2014. 

Ryan retired from the sport after a final season riding the Edinburgh Monarchs in 2016.

References 

1983 births
Living people
American speedway riders
Belle Vue Aces riders
Coventry Bees riders
Edinburgh Monarchs riders
Oxford Cheetahs riders
Peterborough Panthers riders
Plymouth Devils riders
Swindon Robins riders